Rafael Serrano Fernández (born 15 July 1987) is a Spanish former cyclist. He was professional from 2007 to 2010.

Major results
2007
 1st  Time trial, National Under–23 Road Championships
2010
 1st Stage 4 Tour d'Azerbaïdjan
 1st Stage 1 Tour de Beauce

References 

1987 births
Living people
Spanish male cyclists
Sportspeople from the Province of Ciudad Real
Cyclists from Castilla-La Mancha